To the Moon is a 2011 video game by Freebird Games.

To the Moon may also refer to:

 To the Moon (TV series), an upcoming TV series about the GameStop short squeeze
 "To the Moon" (song), a 2021 song by Jnr Choi
 "To the Moon", a 2018 song by Bootleg Rascal featuring Ivan Ooze
 "To the Moon", a song by Kyle from the 2018 album Light of Mine
 "To the Moon", a song by Sara Groves from the 2005 album Add to the Beauty
 "To the Moon", a song by We Are Defiance from the 2011 album Trust in Few
 To the Moon World Tour, 2022 concert tour by American musician Kid Cudi

See also
 
 Moon (disambiguation)
 Talking to the Moon (disambiguation)
 To the Moon and Back (disambiguation)